Sacramento Public Library is a public library system in Sacramento, California. With nearly 2 million items, it is the fourth largest library system in California.

History

Founding
The Sacramento Library Association was established in October 1857 as a public subscription library, and its first roster listed many prominent citizens, including E. B. Crocker, C. P. Huntington, and Leland Stanford.  In 1872, the association acquired a building on I Street between 7th and 8th and furnished a library on the first floor.[2] By 1879, the Library Association was facing financial difficulties and offered to transfer ownership to the City of Sacramento on the condition that it be made free.  The proposal was brought to a vote in the March elections and passed.  The Sacramento Free Public Library opened to the public on Saturday, June 14, 1879, with a collection of 5,695 books.

1918 Carnegie Library Building
By 1913, the Sacramento City Library collection had expanded to fill the 5,763 sq. ft. main library at 716 I Street, and the Sacramento Veteran Knights of Pythias applied to the Carnegie Corporation for the building of a new city library at the corner of 9th and I Streets. After some debate, the Carnegie Corporation approved $100,000 toward a new building and the City of Sacramento pitched in an additional $30,000. The library would be designed by San Francisco architect Loring P. Rixford, whose plans for an Italian Renaissance edifice were chosen from among 56 drawings submitted by architects throughout the Pacific Coast region in a competition conducted under the rules of the American Institute of Architects. The new Sacramento Free Public Library opened to the public at 828 I Street on April 23, 1918.  The building was added to the National Register of Historic Places in 1992.

County Library Service
Under the leadership of Director Lauren W. Ripley, Sacramento Free Public Library reached an agreement with the Board of Supervisors of the County of Sacramento in 1908 to become the first city library in the state of California to extend free service to county residents. The library established the first county deposit station in Elk Grove on October 19, 1908, and by early 1909, had deposit stations at Courtland, Fair Oaks, Folsom, Galt, Oak Park, Sutterville and Vorden.

A separate Sacramento County Library system was established in 1919 and the next year began serving all of Sacramento County, excepting city residents.  The two library systems would remain separate until a July 1966 agreement between the City and County of Sacramento combined their service, unifying them under the management of the City Librarian (henceforth known as the City-County Librarian) as the Sacramento City-County Library.

On August 31, 1993, the Sacramento City Council and Sacramento County Board of Supervisors voted to initiate a joint powers authority to merge all operations of the Sacramento City-County Library, including budgeting and personnel.   Today, the Sacramento Public Library Authority is governed by a Joint Exercise of Powers Agreement between the County of Sacramento and the Cities of Citrus Heights, Galt, Isleton, Elk Grove, Rancho Cordova, and Sacramento. The purpose of the Sacramento Public Library Authority is to provide public library services that provide open access to diverse resources and ideas that inspire learning, promote reading, and enhance community life to all citizens in its member jurisdictions.

Development
In 2011, U.S. Congresswoman Doris Matsui commented that, "The Sacramento Public Library continues to establish itself as a leader in the region, and as a model for other systems." Later that year, Sacramento Public Library became one of 53 places in the world to have an Espresso Book Machine.

As of 2015, the Sacramento Public Library began to stock general materials that community members may need to borrow, such as pots, pans, sewing machines and other similar items in order to offer better services to the community and to draw in larger populations from the area.

Branches
Sacramento Public Library has 28 branches:

Arcade Library
Arden-Dimick Library
Carmichael Library
Central Library
Colonial Heights Library
Belle Cooledge Library
Courtland Library
Del Paso Heights Library
Elk Grove Library
Fair Oaks Library
Franklin Library
Galt-Marian O. Lawrence Library
Isleton Library
Martin Luther King Jr. Library
Ella K. McClatchy Library
McKinley Library
North Highland-Antelope Library
North Natomas Library
North Sacramento-Hagginwood Library
Orangevale Library
Rancho Cordova Library
Rio Linda Library
Robbie Waters Pocket-Greenhaven Library
South Natomas Library
Southgate Library
Sylvan Oaks Library
Valley Hi-North Laguna Library
Walnut Grove Library

References

Carnegie libraries in California
Sacramento
Libraries on the National Register of Historic Places in California
Libraries in Sacramento County, California
Library
Link+ libraries
National Register of Historic Places in Sacramento, California
1857 establishments in California